Claritza Herrera (born 9 October 1952) is a Cuban volleyball player. She competed in the women's tournament at the 1972 Summer Olympics.

References

External links
 

1952 births
Living people
Cuban women's volleyball players
Olympic volleyball players of Cuba
Volleyball players at the 1972 Summer Olympics
Place of birth missing (living people)
Pan American Games medalists in volleyball
Pan American Games gold medalists for Cuba
Medalists at the 1971 Pan American Games
21st-century Cuban women
20th-century Cuban women